Nicolaas Zannekin (died 23 August 1328), was a Flemish peasant leader, best known for his role in a peasant revolt in Flanders from 1323 to 1328.

Nicolaas Zannekin was a rich farmer from Lampernisse. During the early 14th century AD, Zannekin served as leader of the revolt in coastal Flanders against the oppressive tax policy of the Count of Flanders Louis of Nevers. Zannekin and his men captured the towns of Nieuwpoort, Veurne, Ypres and Kortrijk. In Kortrijk, Zannekin was able to capture the Count himself. In 1325 attempts to capture Gent and Oudenaarde failed. The King of France, Charles IV of France intervened whereupon Louis was released from captivity in February 1326 and the Peace of Arques was sealed. In 1328 hostilities erupted again and the Count fled to France. Louis was able to convince the new king Philip VI of France to come to his aid and Zannekin and his followers were decisively defeated by the French royal army in the Battle of Cassel (1328), where Zannekin himself was killed.

References

External links
 

1328 deaths
Revolts involving Flanders
Military personnel killed in action
Flemish activists
People from Diksmuide
Year of birth unknown
14th-century people from the county of Flanders